Curative Inc. is a healthcare startup company best known for scaling COVID-19 testing and COVID-19 vaccinations during the COVID-19 pandemic. In September 2022, Curative Inc. launched Curative Insurance Company, a new health insurance plan featuring no copays and no deductibles. Headquartered in Austin, Texas, with employees throughout the United States, the company was founded in January 2020 by Fred Turner, Isaac Turner (no relation), and Vlad Slepnev to create new diagnostic tests for sepsis and to improve outcomes for sepsis patients. In response to an urgent, unmet need for COVID-19 test development and production in the United States, Curative rapidly shifted focus in March 2020. The company's research team developed a new test for SARS-CoV-2 that utilized oral swabs rather than nasopharyngeal swabs. The Curative test was designed with a scalable process and opportunities to reduce healthcare worker exposure risk, and therefore the amount of personal protective equipment (PPE) used. An independent manufacturing and supply chain model was adopted to avoid competing with existing COVID-19 test companies for limited supplies and laboratory capacity.

The United States Food and Drug Administration (FDA) issued an Emergency Use Authorization (EUA) for Curative's SARS-CoV-2 Assay in April 2020. By October 2020, nearly 10% of the SARS-CoV-2 tests performed in the United States had been performed by Curative, and the company's weekly test processing capacity reached one million tests per week. As of November 2020, Curative had administered more than 2 million tests in the city of Los Angeles, and expanded service offerings to include test site management, test accessibility enhancements (kiosks, mobile vans), and efficient results reporting through proprietary software.

Starting in December 2020, Curative expanded its service to include COVID-19 vaccine distribution, vaccination site management, and vaccine management system for communities in the United States.  As of December 2022, Curative has administered over 35 million tests and administered 2 million vaccines through a network of affiliated providers.

In Q3 of 2022, Curative began the process of shutting down its COVID-19 testing business while simultaneously launching an employer-based health insurance offering**. Utilizing a new model for health insurance, the Curative plan has one monthly premium, and there are no additional costs for accessing medical services and most pharmaceuticals within their broad-based physician network and extensive drug formulary*. The health insurance plan is designed to focus on preventative care and total well-being through proactive relationship management for members. The PPO-network health insurance plan launched in late September 2022 out of Austin, Texas, with plans to expand across other areas of the state in 2023.

As of December 31, 2022, Curative has shut down its COVID-19 services business. In 2023, the company fully shifted its operations to its health insurance business.

History
In January 2020, Fred Turner, Isaac Turner (no relation), and Vlad Slepnev co-founded Curative, Inc. to create new diagnostic tools for the detection and management of sepsis. In response to nationwide (US) shortages of diagnostic test kits, laboratory testing capacity, and personal protective equipment (PPE) available to healthcare workers, the company abruptly pivoted to focus on COVID-19 in March 2020. Curative developed a self-collected oral fluid swab as an alternative sample collection method, an orthogonal supply chain approach to avoid competing with other SARS-CoV-2/COVID-19 test kit and laboratory analysis providers, created the Curative SARS-CoV-2 Assay, and began field tests using supervised self-collection in Los Angeles and  Long Beach (California) in March. In early April, Curative contacted UK government officials, offering to supply 50,000 test kits per week.

The company's novel RT-PCR-based Curative SARS-CoV-2 Assay received FDA Emergency Use Authorization (EUA) in April 2020. At the time the EUA was issued, tests were processed through a partnership between Curative and KorvaLabs; the testing capacity was 5,000 tests per day, and the test kit manufacturing capacity was 20,000 per day. Later in April 2020, the United States Department of Defense signed a US$13M agreement with Curative to source Curative SARS-CoV-2 Assay kits for Air Force use, to establish a new laboratory facility with testing capacity of 50,000 tests per day within one week of signing, and to establish additional test locations across the US at a later date. By October 2020, the company had expanded operations, processing  nearly 10% of the COVID-19 tests performed in the United States. As of March 2021, Curative operated COVID-19 testing laboratories in San Dimas (California), Austin (Texas), and Washington, D.C.

After the Emergency Use Authorization had been issued, health care workers used Curative SARS-CoV-2 Assay to observe, direct, self-collect oral and nasal swabs, and subsequent laboratory analysis.   The Curative SARS-CoV-2 Assay were implemented for medical diagnostic programs in the United States, including United States Armed Forces operations, prisons, state-wide nursing home, long-term care facilities, city-wide centers, regional testing centers, state-wide testing programs, and airports. The company partnered with universities to provide on-campus testing to students and/or student athletes (Texas A&M, Florida A&M (Bragg Stadium), Western New Mexico University, Our Lady of the Lake).

In July 2020, the United States Department of Defense awarded a CARES Act-funded contract (US$42M) to Curative to provide 250,000 test kits for use at more than 100 military treatment facilities, and analysis and reporting services at Curative's high throughput laboratory.

In August, Florida officials signed a contract with Curative to provide COVID-19 testing services for staff at nursing home and long-term care facilities located throughout the state. Using a biweekly testing schedule, the test positivity rate for staff members decreased from 3% to 1%. The state later decided not to renew the contract following a federal government decision to ship rapid antigen detection test kits directly to facilities. Subsequently, "a majority of the state's 694 nursing homes" entered into agreements with Curative to resume testing of staff and expand testing to include residents. In January 2021, the FDA released a Safety Communication which sought to ensure that Curative's test is administered and performed according to the labeling and limitations in the Emergency Use Authorization (EUA). The communication restated the patient populations, test uses, and other conditions that were previously validated and allowed under the original Emergency Use Authorization (EUA).

In late 2020, Curative piloted a drive-through influenza vaccine clinic at an existing Los Angeles SARS-CoV-2 testing site to evaluate the potential community benefits of combining large scale testing and vaccination services. In December 2020, Curative began COVID-19 vaccine distribution in Los Angeles. By February 2021, the company's vaccine distribution and vaccine clinic management service had expanded to sites in California, Delaware, Florida, Massachusetts, Michigan, Pennsylvania, and Texas. In February 2021, Curative made its proprietary Vaccine Management System software available for use by U.S. communities, without cost.

Products

Curative SARS-CoV-2 Assay
The Curative SARS-CoV-2 Assay is a nucleic acid amplification test (NAAT), reverse transcription polymerase chain reaction test (RT-PCR) for COVID-19. The test was designed to be scalable in response to changes in demand, and uses a healthcare worker observed, self-collected oral fluid swab to obtain specimens for testing. During the self-collection procedure, a person coughs before swabbing the inside of their mouth to collect oral fluid for testing; the cough serves to release virus (if present) from the respiratory tract. The self-collected oral fluid swab method is less invasive than the nasopharyngeal swab method, reduces the risk to healthcare workers by eliminating close contact, and reduces the need to change PPE frequently. The reduction in PPE usage was an advantage during the global shortage of medical materials related to the COVID-19 pandemic.

In July 2021, Curative switched over to using Abbott's Alinity m SARS-CoV-2 Assay and requested the FDA revoke EUA clearance for its original test.

Accessible testing
After developing a scalable SARS-CoV-2 diagnostic test and laboratory facilities, Curative worked to make COVID-19 testing as accessible as possible. The company partnered with cities, regions, and states across the United States, setting up and managing different types of testing sites (including drive-through, mobile vans, kiosks, and walkup locations) in an effort to reach general and at-risk populations. As of October 2021, Curative managed 16,557 testing sites nationwide, including mobile van, kiosk, walk-up, and drive-through sites.

Vaccinations
In late 2020, Curative became one of the first companies to administer COVID-19 vaccines in Los Angeles, after vaccines from Pfizer and Moderna became publicly available in the United States. Curative used the scaling principles that enabled it to quickly create mass and mobile COVID-19 testing capabilities to create a vaccine distribution and vaccination management strategy. As of February 2021, the company had partnered with communities in California, Delaware, Florida, Massachusetts, Michigan,  Pennsylvania, and Texas, administering over 2,000,000 vaccinations across 170 sites. Vaccination sites operated by the company include traditional, large scale (also known as mass vaccination), drive-through, and mobile vans. Also in February 2021, Curative made its proprietary Vaccine Management System software available to communities in the United States without cost.

Awards
In 2020, Curative, Inc. was named a LinkedIn Top Startup, and was the recipient of the 2020 dot.LA Summit Award “Pivot of the Year”. In 2021, Curative was named Best Medtech Startup in the Medtech Breakthrough Awards, was a finalist in the Pandemic Response category, and received an honorable mention in the Health category as part of our 2021 World Changing Ideas Awards by Fast Company. The company also received an honorable mention for Fast Company’s Best Place to Work for Innovators Award.

References
'*A Baseline Visit is required of members in order to qualify for no copays and no deductibles for in-network care and preferred prescriptions throughout the calendar year. 

'** Curative Insurance Company

External links

 
 Bloomberg Businessweek Hello World Episode

Technology companies established in 2020
American companies established in 2020
Chemical companies of the United States
Medical technology companies of the United States
Privately held companies based in California
Health care companies based in California
Medical tests
Companies associated with the COVID-19 pandemic
2020 establishments in California